The New River Clyde bridge is a proposed construction as part of the ongoing regeneration of the River Clyde waterfront area, in Scotland. If built, it will be the first new vehicle crossing point on the Clyde since the Clyde Arc bridge was built in 2006.

Proposal 
Renfrewshire Council are proposing a new road bridge to be built between Renfrew and Yoker (the north landing point being on the boundary between the City of Glasgow and West Dunbartonshire local authority areas). The site of the bridge would be at Renfrew Ferry. If built, the structure would more than likely replace the ferry service. As the Clyde is still used for ship building upriver of the proposed crossing at BAE Systems' yards in Scotstoun and Govan, a moveable bridge structure would have to be built to let vessels pass up and down the river. Initial estimates for construction are £50m, using City Deal funding. If given the go-ahead, construction would start in 2018–19.

In late 2018 the project was approved by the Scottish Government, but West Dunbartonshire Council later objected to the bridge with concerns about traffic levels. However, in February 2019, members of West Dunbartonshire Council's IRED committee unanimously voted to drop the council's objection to the project.

References

Road bridges in Scotland
Transport in Renfrewshire
Transport in Glasgow
Proposed bridges in the United Kingdom
Bridges across the River Clyde
Renfrew
Clydebank
Transport in West Dunbartonshire